Fudbalski klub Famos Vojkovići (Serbian Cyrillic: Фудбалски клуб Фамос Војковићи) is a football club from the Vojkovići, part of the City of Istočno Sarajevo in Republika Srpska, Bosnia and Herzegovina.

The club competes in the third tier-Second League of the Republika Srpska. Their neighbors from the community of Hrasnica in Ilidža are only 3,5 kilometers away and called Famos Hrasnica.

Club seasons
Source:

References

External links 
 Club at BiHsoccer.

Association football clubs established in 1968
Football clubs in Republika Srpska
Football clubs in Bosnia and Herzegovina
Istočno Sarajevo
1968 establishments in Bosnia and Herzegovina